Ladies who have belonged throughout history to the Order of the Noble Ladies of Queen Maria Luisa are listed here. Currently and under the statutes in effect a single category is preserved, "Noble Lady", and the number remains limited to 30 holders, unless exceeded by the express will of the king. After Infante Juan of Spain, Count of Barcelona resigned his dynastic rights on 14 May 1977, during reigns of Juan Carlos I and Felipe VI no appointments have been made to the order, so although it formally remains in force, it can be considered that this order is dormant.

Grand Mistresses
1792-1816: 1st Grand Mistress and 1st Dame Grand Cross. Queen María Luisa (wife of King Charles IV), née Princess Maria Luisa of Parma
1816-1818: 2nd Grand Mistress and 101st Dame. Queen Maria Isabel (2nd wife of King Ferdinand VII), née Infanta Maria Isabel of Portugal
1819-1829: 3rd Grand Mistress and 180th Dame. Queen Maria Josepha (3rd wife of King Ferdinand VII), née Princess Maria Josepha Amalia of Saxony
1829-1833: 4th Grand Mistress and 222nd Dame. Queen María Cristina (4th wife of King Ferdinand VII), née Princess Maria Christina of the Two Sicilies
1833-1870: 5th Sovereign and 250th Dame Grand Cross. Queen Isabella II of Spain
1878: 6th Grand Mistress and 562nd Dame. Queen Maria de las Mercedes (Alfonso XII's wife), née Princess Maria de las Mercedes of Orléans y Bórbon
1879-1906: 7th Grand Mistress and 805th Dame Grand Cross. Queen María Cristina (wife of King Alfonso XII), née Archduchess Maria Christina of Austria-Teschen
1906-1941: 8th Grand Mistress and 976th Dame Grand Cross. Queen Victoria Eugenie (wife of King Alfonso XIII), née Princess Victoria Eugenie of Battenberg
1941-1977:  Titular Grand Mistress and 1,171st Dame Grand Cross. Infanta María Mercedes, Countess of Barcelona (wife of Infante Juan, Count of Barcelona), née Princess María de las Mercedes of Bourbon-Two Sicilies
1977-2014: 9th Grand Mistress and 1193rd Dame. Queen Sofía of Spain (wife of King Juan Carlos I of Spain), née Princess Sophia of Greece and Denmark
From 2014: 10th  de facto Grand Mistress. Queen Letizia (wife of King Felipe VI) - There has been no new appointments after Queen Sofía so that this order can be considered as dormant.

Order of María Luisa between 1792 and 1808 

 1. Queen María Luisa of Spain (Charles IV's wife), née Princess Luisa Maria of Parma
 2. Queen Carlota Joaquina of Portugal (John VI's wife), née infanta Carlota Joaquina of Spain, daughter of Queen María Luisa
 3. Infanta María Amalia of Spain, daughter of Queen María Luisa
 4. Queen María Luisa of Etruria (Louis's wife), née Infanta Maria Luisa of Spain, (daughter of Queen María Luisa)
 5. Queen María Isabella of the Two-Sicilies (Francis I's wife), née Infanta María Isabella of Spain, daughter of Queen María Luisa)
 6. Infanta Maria Theresa of Spain, daughter of Queen María Luisa.
 7. Infanta Maria Josefa of Spain, sister of King Charles IV
 8. Duchess Maria Amalia of Parma (née Archduchess Maria Amalia of Austria), Consort of Ferdinand, Duke of Parma
 9. Princess Carolina of Saxony (née Princess Carolina of Parma), daughter of the former
 10. Princess Maria Antonia of Parma, daughter of Duchess Maria Amalia
 11. Princess Maria Carlotta of Parma, daughter of Duchess Maria Amalia
 12. Florentina Pizarro y Herrera, 12th countess of La Gomera 
 13. Laura María Castellví Cervellón y Mercader, 5th countess of Cervellón, marchioness of Villatorcaz 
 14. María Faustina Téllez Girón y Pérez de Guzmán 
 15. María de La Portería Fernández de Velasco, 8th Countess of Peñaranda 
 16. Isabel María Pío, 7th Marchioness of Castel-Rodrigo
 17. María Isidra Manrique de la Cerda y Guzmán, 19th duchess of Nájera, 22nd countess of Valencia de Don Juan
 18. María Teresa Ignacia Fernández de Córdova y Pacheco, 8th countess of Baños 
 19. María de la Concepción Belvís de Moncada y Pizarro 
 20. María de la Encarnación Álvarez de Toledo y Gonzaga 
 21. María Antonia Godoy y Álvarez de Faria, marchioness of Branciforte
 22. Marie Joseph Julie du Chasteler de Moulbaix 
 23. María del Pilar de Silva Fernández de Híjar 
 24. María Agustina Adorno y Sotomayor 
 25. Josefa Joaquina de Olazábal y Murguía 
 26. María Josefa Rebolledo de Palafox y Bermúdez de Castro 
 27. María Luisa Centurión y Velasco, 8th marchioness of Estepa 
 28. María Vicenta Pacheco y Téllez-Girón 
 29. Ana María Fernández de Córdova Figueroa y Moncada 
 30. Joaquina de Benavides y Pacheco, 3rd duchess of Santisteban del Puerto 
 31. María de las Angustias Fernández de Córdova y Pacheco 
 32. María Joaquina de los Desamparados de Montserrat y Acuña 
 33. María Josefa Pimentel y Téllez-Girón, duchess consort of Osuna 
 34. María Teresa del Pilar de Olivares y Cepeda, 2nd marchioness of Villacastel de Carrias 
 35. María Ana de Palafox y Silva 
 36. Princesa Carolina Augusta zu Stolberg-Gedern, Duchess consort of Liria and Jérica
 37. María de la Concépción Teresa Fernández de Córdoba y Sarmiento 
 38. María Ana de Abad y Albret-Bearne, 21st viscountess of Bearne
 39. Francisca de Paula de Benavides y Fernández de Córdova 
 40. María Luisa de Silva y González de Castejón, 15th countess of Cifuentes 
 41. María Antonia Fernández de Córdoba y Sarmiento de Sotomayor 
 42. María Teresa de Silva Fernández de Híjar y Palafox 
 43. María Fernanda Fitz-James-Stuart y Stolberg-Gedern 
 44. Isabel María Parreño Arce y Valdés 
 45. Francisca María Dávila y Carrillo de Albornoz, countess of Truillas 
 46. María Cayetana de Galarza y Brizuela, 3rd countess of la Oliva del Gaytán, 5th countess of Fuenrubia 
 47. Francisca María Bejarano del Águila, marchioness of Sofraga 
 48. Ana María de Contreras y Vargas Machuca, 6th countess of Alcudia 
 49. María Antonia Teijeiro de Valcárcel y Puixmarín, marchioness of Albudeyte 
 50. María de la Portería de Benavides y Pacheco 
 51. Cayetana María de la Cerda y Carnesio-Odescalchi
 52. María Cayetana de la Cerda y Vera 
 53. Eusebia María Tello y Riaño, countess of Villariezo 
 54. María de los Dolores de Vera y Saurín 
 55. María Antonia Cattaneo della Volta 
 56. María Josefa Ramírez de Arellano y Olivares, 7th countess of Murillo 
 57. María del Rosario de Silva Cebrián y Fernández de Miranda, 6th countess of Fuenclara
 58. María del Carmen Pacheco Tellez-Girón Fernández de Velasco 
 59. Francisca de Borja Alfonso de Sousa de Portugal y Sousa de Portugal, 9th marchioness of Guadalcázar 
 60. María Antonia Justa Álvarez de Faria y Sánchez-Sarzosa 
 61. Ana Joaquina de Bustamante y Hoyos 
 62. Francisca Ramírez de Laredo y Encalada 
 63. María Pascuala Everardo-Tilly y Panés, 2nd marchioness of Casa Tilly 
 64. María de la Cabeza Fonseca y Castro 
 65. Rafaela Josefa Ortiz de Rozas y Ruiz de Briviesca 
 66. María Jerónima Daoiz y Guendica 
 67. María Lutgarda de Hevia y Navarro, marchioness of la Victoria 
 68. Juana María Muñoz Jofre de Loaísa y Salcedo 
 69. Francisca Javiera López Altamirano 
 70. Inés María de Aguirre y Yoldi 
 71. María Caro y Ortiz 
 72. Constanza Falconieri, princess of Rocca Sinibalda 
 73. María Ignacia Álvarez de Toledo y Gonzaga
 74. María del Buen Consejo de Carvajal y Gutiérrez de los Ríos
 75. Ana de Llamas y Mena 
 76. Juana María de Pereyra y Alderete
 77. Isabel de Bongars y Martínez 
 78. Brígida de Lalaing Calasanz y Abarca
 79. María Francisca de Sales Portocarrero de Guzmán y Zúñiga, 10th marchioness of La Algaba 
 80. María del Pilar Fernández de Miranda y Villacís 
 81. María Donata de Samaniego y Pizarro, V viscountess of la Armería
 82. María Fernanda O'Connock y Magenis
 83. Petra de Quiñones Álamos y Miranda
 84. Ana Anguisola Pallavicini
 85. Aurelia Canossa Arriani
 86. Juana Antonia Bucarelli y Baeza, 4th marchioness of Vallehermoso, countess of Gerena
 87. Ramona de Godoy y Álvarez de Faria
 88. Juana de Regis de Armendáriz
 89. Princess Amalie of Saxony, daughter of Princess Carolina of Saxony, 9th Dame
 90. Grand-duchess Maria Ferdinanda of Tuscany (Ferdinand III's wife), née Princess Maria Ferdinanda of Saxony, 
 91. María Antonia Sanz-Merino y Muñoz
 92. Paula Melzi de Eril 
 93. María del Pilar de la Cerda y Marín de Resende
 94. María Águeda de Torres y Quiens
 95. Ana Tarrasconi Pallavicini
 96. Maria Teresa de Borbón, princess of la Paz (sister of María Luisa, granddaughter of Felipe V))
 97. la duchess of Sueca (daughter of María Teresa)
 98. María Luisa de Borbón y Vallabriga, duchess of San Fernando de Quiroga (sister of María Teresa, granddaughter of Felipe V))
 99. María Teresa de Vallabriga y Rozas, countess consort of Chinchón (mother of the former, daughter-in-law of Felipe V)

1808-1962 

 100. Infanta Maria Teresa of Portugal, Princess of Beira
 101. Queen Maria Isabel of Spain (Ferdinand VII's 2nd wife), née infanta Maria Isabel of Portugal
 102. Infanta Maria Francisca of Portugal, Infanta Carlos of Spain, Countess consort of Molina (Carlist pretension)
 103. Infanta Isabel Maria of Portugal, regent of Portugal
 104.  Queen Maria Carolina of Naples and Sicily (Ferdinand I's wife), née archduchess Maria Carolina of Austria
 105. Princess Marie-Caroline de Bourbon-Sicile, duchess de Berry
 106. Queen Maria Cristina of Sardinia (Charles Felix's wife), née princess Maria Cristina of Naples and Sicily
 107. Queen Marie Amélie of the French (Louis Philippe I's wife), née princess Maria Amalia of Naples and Sicily
 108. Princess Maria Antonia of Naples and Sicily, princess consort of Asturias (Ferdinand VII of Spain's 1st wife)
 109. Maria Luisa di Tocco Cantelmo Stuart, duchess consort de San Teodoro
 110. María Joaquina de Lalaing y de la Cerda
 111. María Ana Nin de Zatrillas y Sotomayor, 6th duchess of Sotomayor
 112. Maria de Pau van Marck de Lummen, baroness consort of San Luis
 113. Joaquina Josefa de Oca y Navia Lagarde-Salignac
 114. María Aurora Pérez de Guzmán y Gutiérrez de los Ríos 
 115. Teresa Josefa de Salazar y Morales, countess of Montarco
 116. Teresa de Godoy Pizarro y Carvajal, 10th countess of Torrejón
 117. Josefa Crespí de Valldura y Aguilera, marchioness of Peñafuente
 118. María de las Mercedes de Rojas y Tello, 4th marchioness of Villanueva del Duero
 119. María Francisca de Cañas y Portocarrero, 7th duchess del Parque 
 120. Eduarda Manuela Montaner y Ramírez de Arellano
 121. María Magdalena Pelliza y Echverría
 122. Princess Maria Luisa Carlota of Parma, Crown Princess Maximilian of Saxony
 123. Ludovica Altieri, princess consort of Forano
 124. Condesa Arrigheti
 125. Antonia Peccore, condesa Peccore
 126. María Josefa de Contreras y Vargas Machuca, 7th countess of Alcudia, marchioness of Campofuerte 
 127. María Rosa de las Casas y Aragorrí
 128. María de la Candelaria de San Juan y Felíu de la Peña
 129. Joaquina Bernuy y Valda
 130. Lorenza de Guzmán y Castilla, 4th marchioness of San Bartolomé del Monte
 131. María Ramona de Palafox y Portocarrero
 132. Pascuala de Valda y Maldonado
 133. Grand-duchess Maria Anna of Tuscany (Leopold I's wife), née Princess Maria Anna of Saxony, 
 134. Maria Henriette Anna Elisabeth Rosalia, countess of Colloredo-Mannsfeld 
 135. Joséphine de Beauharnais, Empres of the French
 136. Queen Caroline of Naples and Sicily, née princess Caroline Bonaparte
 137. Anna Maria Granieri Manca
 138. Giustina Borromeo Arese d'Angera, princess consort di Palestrina
 139. Amalia Charlotte, princess Barberini-Colonna 
 140. Infanta Maria da Assunção of Portugal
 141. Infanta Ana de Jesus Maria of Portugal, Marchioness of Loulé
 142. Princess Benedicta de Brazil, Infanta Benedita of Portugal
 143. María Magdalena Fernández de Córdoba y Ponce de León 
 144. Gabriella Maria Ignazia Asinari dei marchesi di San Marzano 
 145. Francisca de Almeida Portugal
 146. María Josefa de Gálvez y Valenzuela, 2nd marchioness of la Sonora
 147. María Rafaela Centurión y Vera
 148. María Francisca Vera de Aragón y Manuel de Villena, marchioness of Espinardo
 149. María Escolástica Gutiérrez de los Ríos y Sarmiento de Sotomayor 
 150. María del Pilar Gayoso de los Cobos y Bermúdez de Castro
 151. Maria do Resgate de Noronha
 152. Francisca Correia de Lacerda Melo Pita Pacheco, 13th dame of Favelães 
 153. Juliana Xavier Botelho, marchioness of Lumiares 
 154. Margarida Xavier Botelho de Lancastre, 1st marchioness of São Miguel 
 155. María del Carmen Álvarez de Faria y Pelliza, 1st marchioness of Gracia Real
 156. María Luisa Isabel de Borbón y Braganza, infanta of Spain
 157. María del Carmen Josefa López de Zúñiga y Chaves, 15th countess of Miranda del Castañar, 10th duchess of Peñaranda de Duero
 158. María de los Dolores Villanueva y Pérez de Barradas
 159. María de la Asunción Belvís de Moncada y Rojas, countess of Villamarciel, 5th marchioness of Villanueva del Duero, Grande de España, 7th countess of Villariezo y de Villaverde
 160. María del Carmen de Aguayo y Aguayo, 4th countess of Villaverde la Alta
 161. María Ana de Witte y Pau
 162. Josefa de Herrera y Berrío
 163. María de la Concepción Castaños y Aragorri
 164. Catalina de Sierra y Sierra
 165. María Luisa de Navia y Güemes
 166. Narcisa Asprer y de la Canal
 167. Empress Elisabeth Alexeievna of Russia (Alexander I's wife) princess Louise of Baden
 168. Empress Sophie Dorothea of Russia (Paul I's wife) née duchess Sophie Dorothea of Württemberg
 169. Empress Maria Leopoldina of Brazil (Pedro I's 1st wife), née archduchess Maria Leopoldina of Austria
 170. Empress Caroline Augusta of Austria (Francis I's wife), née princess Caroline Augusta of Bavaria
 171. Orsola Bourbon del Monte dei conti di Mealla
 172. Archduchess Clementina of Austria, princess Leopold of Two Sicilies, princess of Salerno
 173. Lucia Migliaccio duchess of Floridia, 2nd morganatic wife of King Ferdinand I of the Two Sicilies
 174. Mariana Griffeo Migliacio
 175. Infanta Luisa Carlota of Spain, née Princess Princess Luisa Carlotta of Naples and Sicily, wife of Infante Francisco de Paula of Spain
 176. Queen Amalie of Saxony (Frederick Augustus I's wife) née countess palatine Amalie of Zweibrücken-Birkenfeld
 177. Princess Maria Anna of Saxony, daughter of Frederick Christian, Elector of Saxony
 178. Princess Maria Augusta of Saxony, daughter of Queen Amalie, 176th Dame
 179. Princess Maria Kunigunde of Saxony, princess-abbess of Essen and Thorn (daughter of Augustus III of Poland)
 180. Queen Maria Josepha of Spain (Ferdinand VII's 3rd wife), née princess Maria Josepha Amalia of Saxony
 181. Queen Maria Theresa of Saxony (Anthony's wife), née archduchess Maria Theresa of Austria
 182. countess of La Tour-Maubourg
 183. María de las Mercedes Belvís de Moncada y Pizarro
 184. María de los Dolores Diega Ramírez de Arellano y Olivares, 3th marchioness of Villacastel de Carrias
 185. María Josefa de Salcedo Cañaveral y Cañas, marchioness of Vallecerrato, 8th duchess del Parque
 186. Luisa Joaquina Escrivá de Romaní y de Taberner
 187. María Francisca Álvarez de Bohorques y Pérez de Barradas
 188. María Antonia de Salazar y Álvarez de Toledo
 189. Juana Jerónima Valcárcel y Alfaro, 6th countess of Balazote
 190. María de Guadalupe de Moncada y Berrio, 1st marchioness of San Román
 191. Bruna Gutiérrez de los Ríos y Sarmiento de Sotomayor
 192. María Rosa Gastón de Iriarte y Navarrete
 193. María de las Angustias de Orozco y Bernuy 
 194. Maria Felisa Alliata
 195. Maria Theresa of Austria-Este, Queen of Sardinia née princess of Modena
 196. Duchess Maria Teresa of Parma (Charles II's wife), née Princess Maria Teresa of Savoy
 197. Empress Maria Anna of Austria (Ferdinand I's wife), née princess Maria Anna of Savoy
 198. Queen Maria Cristina of Two-Sicilies (Ferdinand II's 1st wife),  née princess Maria Cristina of Savoy
 199. Infanta Isabel Fernanda of Spain, countess Gurowska, daughter of Infante Francisco de Paula of Spain
 200. Maria do Carmo Xavier Botelho de Portugal 
 201. María Teresa Federica de Sousa Holstein 
 202. Archduchess Marie Caroline of Austria, Crown Princess of Saxony
 203. Queen Amalie Auguste of Saxony (John's wife), née princess Amalie Auguste of Bavaria 
 204. Marie Thérèse of France, Madame Royale, duchess of Angoulême
 205. Antónia Basília Herédia de Bettencourt 
 206. Duchess Louise of Parma (Charles III's wife), née Louise Marie Thérèse of Artois, princess of France
 207. María de los Dolores de Araoz y Arredondo
 208. María Antonia de Witte y Rodríguez de Alburquerque
 209. Julia, princesa Tatischeff
 210. Augustine Frédérique Joséphine du Bouchet de Sourches de Tourzel 
 211. Louise de Rosiéres-Sorans
 212. Beatrice d'Amblimont, marchioness of Delage
 213. Isabel Antónia do Carmo de Roxas e Lemos Carvalho e Menezes 
 214. María del Carmen Bernuy y Aguayo
 215. Infanta Luisa Teresa of Spain, duchess of Sessa, daughter of Infante Francisco de Paula of Spain
 216. Catherine Noele Verlée 
 217. María Manuela Vera de Aragón y Nin
 218. María Eulalia de Queralt y Silva 
 219. Mariana Lombardo, marchioness consort of Montemaggiore
 220. Ana María Riccio, princess consort of Pandolfina 
 221. María de la Soledad Visitación Pacheco y Benavides
 222. Queen María Cristina of Spain (Ferdinand VII's 4th wife), née princess Maria Christina of the Two Sicilies
 223. Grand Duchess Maria Antonia of Tuscany (Leopold II's wife) née Princess Maria Antonia of the Two Sicilies
 224. Princess Maria Amalia of Bourbon-Two Sicilies, Infanta Sebastian of Portugal and Spain
 225. Empress Alexandra Feodorovna of Russia (Nicholas I's wife), née princess Charlotte of Prussia
 226. Marie-Caroline de La Forest 
 227. Infanta Josefina Fernanda of Spain, daughter of Infante Francisco de Paula of Spain
 228. María Luisa de Carvajal y de Queralt 
 229. María Eulalia de Carvajal y de Queralt 
 230. Juliana Luisa Maria de Oyenhausen de Almeida, countess of Oyenhausen-Graven 
 231. Emma Brochowsk
 232. Joaquina Josefa de Carvajal y Manrique de Lara
 233. Infanta María Teresa, daughter of Infante Francisco de Paula of Spain
 234. Agata Gravina, princesa di Palagonia e di Lercara 
 235. Bernarda Manso de Velasco y Chaves
 236. María Josefa García de la Peña y Torres
 237. Gabriela Caballero y Rebollo
 238. María Bernarda Ortiz de Guinea y Terán
 239. María de la Encarnación Josefa Ponce de León y Carvajal
 240. María Amalia de Cron y de Witte
 241. Giovanna Ruffo dei duchi di Bagnara
 242. Condesa di San Martino
 243. Vittoria d'Aquino
 244. Stefania Moncada, princess consort of Cassero e di Sabuci 
 245. María Josefa Gayoso de los Cobos y Téllez Girón, marchioness of Camarasa
 246. Princess Maria Carolina of Bourbon-Two Sicilies, Infanta Carlos of Spain, Countess consort of Montemolin
 247. Empress Teresa Cristina of Brazil (Pedro II's wife), née princess Teresa Cristina of the Two Sicilies
 248. Ekaterina Mijailovna Potemkina, countess consort of Ribeaupierre 
 249. Auguste Charlotte Louise de Riquet de Caraman, duchess consort de Almazán de Saint Priest
 250. Queen Isabella II of Spain
 251. Francisca Pignatelli Cortés y Aragón
 252. Joaquina Téllez Girón y Pimentel
 253. Ramona Pardo de Figueroa Lanzós de Novoa
 254. María del Rosario de Zayas Rejón y Arias de Saavedra, countess consort of Atarés
 255. Francisca de Paula Taboada de Mendoza y López
 256. Manuela Sagarra de Manuel de Villena
 257. María Tomasa Palafox y Portocarrero, duchess consort de Medina Sidonia
 258. María de la Asunción Dorotea Guillermina La Boine de Berghe
 259. María Vicenta de la Cerda y Palafox
 260. María Francisca Núñez del Castillo y Montalvo
 261. Agustina de Mendizábal e Irisarri
 262. María Teresa Josefa de Ugarte y Risel
 263. Luisa Felicidad Correa de Sotomayor
 264. María Francisca de la Cabeza de Cascajares y Muñoz Serrano
 265. María de los Dolores Pacheco y Gómez de Barreda
 266. Ana Agapita de Valda y Teijeiro de Valcárcel
 267. María Manuela Monserrat y Ester
 268. Carlota La Grúa y Godoy
 269. Victorine-Josephe Auriol
 270. Infanta Luisa Fernanda, duchess of Montpensier, sister of Isabella II
 271. Juana Ortiz de Rozas e Ibáñez de la Bárcena
 272. Julia Gaetani, princesa Gaetani
 273. Infanta María Cristina of Spain 
 274. María del Pilar de Pando y Fernández de Pinedo
 275. María Juliana Mollinedo y Cáceres
 276. María Antonia de Anduaga y Siles
 277. María Joaquina de Miranda y Sebastián
 278. María del Carmen Gragera y Topete
 279. María de la Concepción Ponce de León y Carvajal 
 280. Rosalia Ventimiglia y Moncada, duchess consort de Alba de Tormes (princesa Ventimiglia di Grammonte) 
 281. María de la Trinidad Wall y Manrique de Lara
 282. Carlota Luisa de Güemes y Muñoz de Loaysa
 283. María de la Encarnación Álvarez de Bohorques y Chacón
 284. María de los Dolores de Santisteban y Horcasitas
 285. Inés Francisca de Silva y Téllez Girón
 286. María del Pilar Gayoso de los Cobos y Téllez Girón
 287. Mary de Bode-Kynnerlsey
 288. Queen Victoria of the United Kingdom.
 289. María Teresa Fraga de Requena y Grases
 290. Queen Caroline Amalie of Denmark and Norway (Christian VIII's wife), née princess Caroline Amalie of Schleswig-Holstein-Sonderburg-Augustenburg 
 291. María de la Concepción de la Vega y Rodríguez del Toro, countess consort of Torre Pando
 292. Queen Marie of Denmark and Norway (Frederick VI of Denmark's wife) née princess and landgravine Marie of Hesse-Kassel
 293. María Vicenta Moñino y Pontejos
 294. Queen Maria II of Portugal
 295. Empress Amélie of Brazil (Pedro I's wife), née princess Amélie of Leuchtenberg (mother of Princess Maria Amélia of Brazil, 333rd Dame)
 296. Infanta Amelia Philippina of Spain, Princess Princess Adalbert of Bavaria   (sister-in-law of Queen Isabella II, 250th Dame and mother of Princess Clara Eugenie of Bavaria, 1109th Dame)
 297. Isabel María Roca de Togores y Valcárcel
 298. Queen Louise Marie of the Belgians (Leopold I's wife), née princess Louise of Orléans, Princess of France
 299.  Eugénia Francisca Xavier Teles da Gama
 300. María dos Prazeres Giráo de Sousa e Melo
 301. María Magdalena Osés de Córdoba y Villahermosa
 302. María Jacinta Martínez de Sicilia y Santa Cruz
 303. Luisa María Fernández de Córdova y Álvarez de Bohorques
 304. Manuela de Carvajal y Téllez-Girón
 305. Juana María de la Vega y Martínez
 306. Alejandra de Wlodeck y Lagarde-Salignac
 307. Duchess Helene of Mecklenburg-Schwerin, Princess Ferdinand Philippe of France, Duchess of Orleans, sister-in-law of Queen Louise Marie, 298th Dame.
 308. María de Caño Santo de Cepeda y Nonet
 309. María Rosa de Alburquerque, wife of Manuel de Cañas-Trujillo y Sánchez de Madrid, Minister of Marine, Trade and Overseas Ultramar
 310. Marie-Louise Thomas de Pange
 311. María de las Angustias Fernández de Córdova y Pacheco
 312. Lady Elizabeth Frances Villiers, viscountess consort Ponsonby de Imokilly 
 313. María de la Candelaria Saavedra y Ramírez de Baquedano, 11th countess of Sevilla la Nueva 
 314. Luisa Carlota Sáenz de Viniegra y Velasco
 315. Eusebia de Zafra Vázquez y Pérez del Cid
 316. María Ramona Ozores y Valderrama
 317. María de la Fuencisla de Artacho y Chaves
 318. Louise-Cordélia Greffulhe
 319. Eulalie Elise Dosne
 320. María Luisa Ferrándiz Bendicho y Luzzi
 321. María del Carmen Chacón y Carrillo de Albornoz
 322. María Felipa de Carondelet y Castaños
 323. María Magdalena Tecla Caballero y Terreros
 324. Fernanda María de Silva y Téllez-Girón
 325. Joaquina de Loaysa y Topete
 326. Francisca Coello de Portugal y Ramírez
 327. María de la Soledad Bernaldo de Quirós y Colón de Larreátegui
 328. Rosa del Corro, wife of Pío Pita Pizarro, Minister of Economy
 329. María de la Concepción de Castro
 330. Jacoba Ortiz de Taranco y Sáez de Nieto
 331. María de los Dolores Traggia de Torres
 332. María de la Encarnación de Cueto y Ortega
 333. Princess Maria Amélia of Brazil, daughter of Empress Amélie of Brazil, 295th Dame
 334. Carolina Mortier de Trévise
 335. Francisca de Brito Pinto
 336. María de los Dolores de Borja y Fernández Buenache, 1st marchioness of Camachos, 3rd marchioness of Casa Tilly
 337. Adelaida María O'Kelly y Castilla 
 338. Princess Januária of Brazil, countess of Aquila, daughter of Emperor Pedro I, half-sister of Princess Maria Amélia, 333rd Dame.
 339. Maria Ana Luisa Filomena de Mendoça 
 340. Maria Teresa Margarida Horan FitzGerald 
 341. Joaquina del Corral y Arias
 342. María Francisca de Villanueva y Sousa
 343. Queen Anna of the Netherlands (William II's wife),  née Grand-Duchess Anna Pavlovna of Russia
 344. María de Belén González de Larrínaga y Benítez
 345. María de la Soledad Samaniego y Asprer
 346. María Luisa Sánchez Pleytés y García de la Peña
 347. María del Patrocinio Goicoolea y Ariza
 348.  María Juana Lassus y Vallés
 349. María de la Concepción Ortiz de Sandoval y Arias de Saavedra
 350. Isabel de Heredia y Livermore, countess consort of Zaldívar
 351. María del Pilar Juez Sarmiento y Mollinedo
 352. María del Rosario Bernuy y Valda
 353. Isabel Domínguez y Guevara
 354. Manuela Domínguez Navas
 355. María de la Soledad Bernuy y Valda
 356. María de la Encarnación Fernández de Córdova y Álvarez de Bohorques
 357. María de la Paz de Queralt y Bucarelli
 358. María del Carmen Álvarez de Bohorques y Giráldez
 359. María Ramona de Campos y Matheos
 360. Rafaela Anzano y Parreño
 361. Micaela de Frías y Altamirano
 362. María de Uribe y Samaniego
 363. María de la Paz Rodríguez de Valcárcel y O'Conry
 364. María del Carmen Villavicencio y Pita da Veiga
 365. Mariana de Miranda y Olmedilla
 366. María del Rosario Valdés y Ramírez de Jove
 367. María de la Candelaria Díaz de Riguero y Gutiérrez de la Concha
 368. Queen Maria Theresa of Two-Sicilies (Ferdinand II's wife), née archduchess Maria Theresa of Austria-Teschen
 369. Marie Alexandrine de Tascher, relative of (Joséphine de Beauharnais), Empres of the French
 370. Manuela María Bargés y Petre
 371. María Francisca Palafox Portocarrero y KirkPatrick, 12th duchess of Peñaranda, 
 372. María de la Concepción Coello de Portugal y Ramírez
 373. Gabriela del Alcázar y Vera de Aragón, 7th duchess of Sotomayor 
 374. Princess Victoria of Saxe-Coburg and Gotha, duchess of Nemours
 375. Princess Adélaïde of Orléans, mademoiselle de Chartres, sister of Louis-Philippe I of the French
 376. María de los Dolores Aguirre y Rosales
 377. María de la O Jacoba Giráldez y Cañas
 378. María del Carmen de la Pezuela y Ceballos
 379. Isabel Josefa de Aranda y Salazar
 380. Luisa Carlota de Pechpeyron de Cominges de Guitaut
 381. María del Pilar de la Cerda y Gand-Vilain
 382. Ana Jaspe y Macías, duchess consort de Escalona
 383. Nicolasa de Aragón y Arias de Saavedra
 384. Joaquina Patiño y Ramírez de Arellano
 385. Josefa de Tudó, 1st Countess of Castillo Fiel
 386. María Manuela de Negrete y Cepeda
 387. María Teresa Trejo del Campo
 388. María de África Josefa Fernández de Córdoba 
 389. María Dominga Bernaldo de Quirós y Colón de Larreátegui
 390. María de la Encarnación Osorio de Moscoso y Ponce de León
 391. Valerie de Beaufort-Spontin
 392. Francisca Merino de la Cuadra
 393. Antonia María Carcelén Ladrón de Guevara
 394. María del Carmen Pérez Ladrón de Guevara, 5th marchioness of CasasViejas 
 395. Francisca de Paula de Tovar y Peguera
 396. María del Carmen de Ibarrola y Mollinedo, countess consort of Carlet
 397. María Josefa Casilda de Ibarrola y Mollinedo, marchioness consort of Mirasol
 398. María de los Dolores de Chaves y Artacho
 399. María del Rosario de Queralt y Bucarelli
 400. Josefa de Ceballos y Álvarez de Faria
 401. María de los Dolores de Urzáiz y de Castro
 402. María Eduvigis Gutiérrez Vigil y del Castillo
 403. María de la Encarnación Gayoso de los Cobos y Téllez Girón
 404. María de los Desamparados-Carmen Bernuy y Valda
 405. Antonina Venegas de Saavedra y Torres
 406. Luisa de Villanueva y Zayas
 407. María Manuela de Godoy y Armendáriz
 408. María de los Ángeles del Álamo y Algaba
 409. Inés Blake y Tovar
 410. Princess Maria Carolina of Bourbon-Two Sicilies, duchess consort of Aumale
 411. Manuela Mon y Menéndez 
 412. Josefa Díaz Armero
 413. María Teresa de Villalpando y San Juan
 414. María de los Dolores Goicoolea y Ariza
 415. María Teresa Tavira y Acosta
 416. Josefa López Montenegro
 417. María de la Soledad Vázquez Alcalá
 418. María de la Concepción Goicoolea y Ariza
 419. María de los Dolores de Contreras y Aranda
 420. Eulalie de L'Espine
 421. Alejandra Muñoz Sánchez
 422. María de la Concepción Doz y Gordon
 423. Felicia de Alvear y Fernández de Lara
 424. Louise Mitchell Meredith Read, Marchioness of Tomar
 425. María de la Concepción Aristizábal y Lacassaigne
 426. María Cayetana de Acuña y Dewitte
 427. Isabel Borrell y Lemus
 428. María de los Dolores Perinat y Ochoa, wife of Joaquín Francisco Pacheco y Gutiérrez-Calderón, Prime Minister of Spain
 429. María Josefa de Allendesalazar y Mazarredo
 430. Petronila Livermore y Salas, marchioness consort of Salamanca
 431. María Teresa Chaves y Loaísa
 432. María Antonia Godínez y Cea Bermúdez
 433. Joaquina de Queralt y Bucarelli
 434. María de los Dolores Gardoqui y Jarabeitia
 435. María de los Dolores Mirasol y Bernad
 436. María de los Dolores Serrano y Domínguez
 437. María Benedicta de Castro Canto e Melo Pereira
 438. María del Pilar Salvador y Udi
 439. María del Carmen Quintana y Romo, marchioness consort of Guad-el-Jelú 
 440. Juana García Gómez
 441. María del Rosario Izquierdo y Lassaleta
 442. Teresa Romano y Rizo
 443. María de los Dolores Gómez de la Serna y de las Casas
 444. Manuela García de Molviedro
 445. María Amalia Lambelin, marchioness consort of Recalmici 
 446. Marie Susanne Oakey 
 447. Joaquina Bernaldo de Quirós y Colón de Larreátegui
 448. Genoveva de Apéstegui y López de Gamarra
 449. María Cristina de Sorróndegui y Martínez de Alcaide
 450. María del Carmen Machín y Martínez de Alcaide
 451. María de las Mercedes Manuel de Villena y Justiniani
 452. María de la Concepción del Nero y Salamanca
 453. Vicenta Salvador y Frías
 454. María del Carmen de Guzmán y Caballero
 455. Narcisa Martínez de Irujo y McKean
 456. María Julia Rebolledo de Palafox
 457. Rosa López de Carrizosa y Dávila
 458. Manuela Baltasara del Mazo y Blake
 459. Ana Berroeta y del Villar
 460. María Ana D'Adda
 461. Crescencia de Aguirre-Solarte y Alcíbar
 462. María Cristina Osorio de Moscoso y Carvajal, 12th duchess of Sanlúcar la Mayor
 463. Princess Marie Isabelle of Orléans, countess consort of Paris
 464. Luisa Federica Juana Emmy de Zesterfleth
 465. Fausta González-Torres de Navarra y Álvarez de Bohorques
 466. María de los Ángeles Soler y Lacy
 467. Sabina Benítez de Parejo
 468. Teresa, princess Colonna
 469. Fernanda de Villarroel y Goicoolea
 470. María de las Mercedes Alcalá Galiano y Valencia
 471. María Amelia de Orleans, infanta of Spain
 472. María Narcisa de Pastors y de Sala
 473. Isabella, Princess of Asturias
 474. Maria Cristina of Orléans, infanta of Spain
 475. Empress Eugénie of the French, née Eugénie de Montijo, countess of Teba
 476. Princess Margherita of Bourbon-Parma, Duchess consort of Madrid
 477. Grand Duchess Alice of Tuscany (Ferdinand IV's wife), née Princess Alice of Parma
 478. Louise Genthner
 479. Fernandina Montenegro y Cogordan
 480. Isabel Prieto-Tirado y Rañón
 481. Empress Elisabeth of Austria, née Duchess Elisabeth in Bavaria (Sissi)  (mother of Gisela, 601st Dame, daughter of Ludovika, 613th Dame and sister of Helene, 815th Dame and Maria Sophie, 552nd Dame)
 482. Ana María de Sevilla y Villanueva
 483. Leocadia de Echagüe y Aracués
 484. María del Carmen Ozores y Mosquera
 485. Isabel, Princess Imperial of Brazil
 486. María de los Dolores Tosta González
 487. Infanta Maria Anna of Portugal, Princess George of Saxony
 488. Eugénia de Saldanha de Oliveira e Daun 
 489. María Joaquina de Miranda y Rivas
 490. María del Rosario de Areizaga y Magallón
 491. María de los Dolores Collado y Echagüe
 492. María Luisa Álvarez de las Asturias Bohorques y Giráldez
 493. Inés de Silva
 494. Luisa Napoleona Mouton de Lobau
 495. Gertrudis Enríquez y Sequera
 496. María de la Concepción de Castañeda y Neve
 497. Infanta Antónia of Portugal, princess consort of Hohenzollern 
 498. María Isabel Queipo de Llano y Gayoso de los Cobos
 499. Queen Carola of Saxony, née Carola of Vasa, princess of Sweden
 500. Francisca de Paula de Agüero y González, duchess of Prim
 501. María Ana Catalina de Ricci
 502. Antonia Domínguez y Borrell
 503. Queen Marie of Bavaria (Maximilian II's wife), née princess Marie of Prussia
 504. María de los Dolores Bonilla y Valdivia
 505. Cristina Gordon y Prendergast
 506. Anna Isabella de Bocholtz-Asseburg 
 507. Josefa Rosa de Amorim
 508. María de la Regla de Orléans, infanta de España 
 509. Rosa de Losada y Miranda
 510. María Amalia Justiniani y Núñez de Castro
 511. María Teresa Riquelme y Arce
 512. Ángela Muñoz de Salazar y Martorell
 513. Caralampia Arizcun y Flórez
 514. Gorgonia de Entrala y Férriz de Guzmán
 515. Empress Maria Alexandrovna of Russia (Alexander II's wife), née princess Marie of Hesse and by Rhine
 516. Charlotte de Brunnon
 517. Luisa Constantina de Croÿ, countess consort of Benckendorff (princess of Croÿ)
 518. Rafaela Domínguez y Navas, marchioness consort of Santa Marina
 519. countess of Demoulins
 520. María del Rosario Fernández de Santillán y Valdivia
 521. Baronesa de Malsen
 522. Francisca Javiera Osborne y Böhl de Faber
 523. Isabel Álvarez de Toledo y Silva
 524. Princess Clémentine of Orléans, Princess of Saxe-Coburg and Gotha
 525. Empress Carlota of Mexico (Maximilian I's wife), née princess Charlotte of Belgium (Daughter of Queen Louise Marie, 298th Dame)
 526. Princess Maria Clotilde of Savoy, Princess Napoléon Bonaparte
 527. María de los Dolores de Cárdenas y Orozco
 528. Isabel de León e Ibarrola
 529. María del Pilar de Villanueva y Carbonell
 530. María del Rosario Desmaissiéres y Fernández de Santillán
 531. María Isabel de la Pezuela y Ceballos
 532. María Josefa del Corral y Suelves
 533. María del Pilar de Chaves y Loaysa
 534. María del Pilar de Liñán y Fernández
 535. María Teresa León y Cobos
 536. Joaquina de Silva y Fernández de Córdova
 537. Sofía Moscoso de Altamira Taboada, 2nd countess of Fontao
 538. María del Carmen Pascual del Pobil y Ponce de León
 539. María Ana de Dusay y de Fivaller
 540. Queen Sophie of the Netherlands, Grand-Duchess of Luxembourg (William III's wife) née princess Sophie of Württemberg
 541. Baronesa de Wendland
 542. María de las Angustias de Zuloaga y Alvarado
 543. María de la Paz Ximénez de Bagüés
 544. María Ramona Sánchez Arjona y Jaraquemada
 545. Manuela de la Paciencia Fernández de Córdova y Güemes
 546. Jacoba Valdés e Inclán
 547. Matilde de Carondelet y Donado
 548. Inés Patiño y Osorio
 549. María Josefa Coello de Portugal y Quesada
 550. Albina Tresserra y Thompson
 551. Matilde Díaz Trechuelo y Ostman
 552. Queen Maria Sophie of the Two Sicilies (Francis II's wife), née duchess Maria Sophie in Bavaria  (daughter of Ludovika, 613th Dame, sister of Empress Sissi, 481st Dame and Duchess Helene, 815th Dame)
 553. María del Carmen Lucía de Acuña y Dewitte, 9th marchioness of Castrofuerte 
 554. Julia Grund
 555. María de las Mercedes Pérez del Pulgar y Fernández de Córdoba
 556. Agustina de Halen y Lasquetty
 557. Ana del Castillo de Souza
 558. Amalia Heredia Livermore, marchioness consort of Casa-Loring
 559. Mariana Georgina Pereira Palha de Faria Lacerda 
 560. Julia Trophimovna, princesa consorte Galitzina (condesa Baranova)
 561. María Serafina de Montalvo y Cárdenas
 562. Queen Maria de las Mercedes of Spain (Alfonso XII's wife), née Maria de las Mercedes of Orléans y Borbon, infanta of Spain
 563. Isabel Barutell y Bazzoni
 564. Jean de Tolstoy
 565. Francisca de Allendesalazar y Loizaga
 566. Paula de Orúe y Bajos
 567. Grand Duchess Mathilde Caroline of Hesse (Louis III's wife), née Princess Mathilde Caroline of Bavaria
 568. Elena Alcalá-Galiano y Valencia
 569. Adelaida de Guzmán y Caballero
 570. María del Carmen Pizarro y Ramírez
 571. Rosa Prendergast y Gordon
 572. María Celestina Balez y Goicoechea
 573. María de los Desamparados Muñoz y Borbón
 574. María de los Milagros Muñoz y de Borbón, marchioness of Castillejo 
 575. María Cristina Muñoz y Borbón, 1st marchioness of la Isabela 
 576. Laureana Díaz de Mendoza y Valcárcel
 577. María de los Dolores Díaz de Mendoza y Valcárcel
 578. Infanta María del Pilar of Spain, daughter of Isabella II of Spain, 250th Dame  (sister of Infanta María de la Paz, 593rd and Infanta Eulalia, 620th)
 579. María del Pilar de Zavala y Guzmán, 20th marchioness of Aguilar de Campoo
 580. Emilie Hegnauer
 581. Amalia Núñez de Castro y Arizabalo
 582. María del Carmen Fernández de Córdova y Álvarez de Bohorques
 583. Carlota Sáenz de Viniegra y Velasco
 584. Francisca Tacón y Aché
 585. María Josefa de Silva y Téllez Girón
 586. María de la Encarnación O'Lawlor y Caballero
 587. María de los Dolores Cistué y Bernaldo de Quirós
 588. Archduchess Auguste Ferdinande of Austria, wife of Luitpold, Prince Regent of Bavaria (mother of Pr. Theresa Charlotte, 629th Dame)
 589. María de los Dolores Garcés de Marcilla y Heredia
 590. Francisca de Pando e Iglesias
 591. María Blanca Fernández de Córdova y Álvarez de Bohorques
 592. Joaquina de Pedro y Nash
 593. Infanta María de la Paz of Spain, Princess Ludwig Ferdinand of Bavaria (daughter of Isabella II of Spain, 250th Dame; mother of Princess Pilar of Bavaria, 901st; sister of María del Pilar, 578th and Eulalia, 620th)
 594. María de la Cruz Álvarez y Alonso
 595. Vicenta Fernández de Luco y Santa Cruz
 596. Vicenta Gutiérrez de la Concha y Fernández de Luco
 597. Carolina Gutiérrez de los Ríos y Rodríguez-Guerrero de Luna
 598. María del Carmen Cabeza de Vaca y Diosdado
 599. Fernanda Gavarre y Pérez del Pulgar
 600. Josefa de Arce y Muñoz-Flores
 601. Archduchess Gisela of Austria, Princess Leopold of Bavaria (daughter of Sissi, 481st Dame, granddaughter of Ludovika, 613th Dame)
 602. María Josefa de Cárdenas y Beitia
 603. María de Jesús de Herrera y Herrera
 604. Georgina Manvers Manby
 605. Marie Mathilde Julie Hermine de Saint-Cricq
 606. Princess Leopoldina of Brazil, Princess Ludwig August of Saxe-Coburg and Gotha
 607. Queen Marie Henriette of the Belgians (Léopold II's wife), née archduchess Marie Henriette of Austria  (sister of Archduchess Elisabethh Franciska, 806th Dame and mother of Princess Stéphanie, 829th Dame)
 608. Octavia de Saavedra y Cueto
 609. María de la Esperanza Pérez de Tafalla y Zuloaga
 610. Princess Maria Annunciata of Bourbon-Two Sicilies, 2nd wife of Archduke Karl Ludwig of Austria (mother of Franz Ferdinand & Otto Franz)
 611. Queen Marie of Hannover (George V's wife), née princess Marie of Saxe-Altenburg
 612. Princess Isabella of Bavaria, Princess Thomas of Italy, duchess consort of Genoa   (daughter of Infanta Amelia Philippina, 296th Dame and sister of Clara, 1109th Dame; niece of King-Consort Francis of Spain, Duke of Cádiz)
 613. Princess Ludovika of Bavaria, duchess Maximilian Joseph in Bavaria   (mother of Empress Sissi, 481st Dame and Duchess Helene, 815th Dame, grandmother of Gisela of Austria, 601st Dame)
 614. María de la Concepción de Herrera y Ayala
 615. Joaquina García Vicuria
 616. Ramona Dolores Cortés y Bautista
 617. Felisa Blanco y Guerrero
 618. Matilde Cervetto y Blanco
 619. María de Gracia Ladoux y Bonal
 620. Infanta Eulalia of Spain, duchess of Galliera, daughter of Queen Isabella II, 250th Dame  (sister of Infanta María del Pilar, 578th Dame and Infanta María de la Paz, 593rd Dame)
 621. Lucie Borchgrave d'Altena, condesa Borchgrave d'Altena
 622. María del Carmen Matheu-Arias-Dávila y Carondelet
 623. María del Buen Consejo de Losada y Fernández de Liencres
 624. Maria Servelloni, countess consort Crivelli
 625. María de Aguilera y Santiago de Perales
 626. Anna Debelle, duchess consort de Rivoli
 627. Pauline van der Linden d'Hooghvorst
 628. Ana Micaela Guerrero, wife of Lorenzo Arrazola y García, Spanish Prime Minister
 629. Princess Theresa Charlotte of Bavaria (daughter of Archduchess Auguste Ferdinande, 588th Dame) 
 630. María de los Dolores Remisa y Rafo
 631. Josefa Godoy de Lara
 632. María Francisca de Borja Fernández de Córdova y Bernaldo de Quirós
 633. María de la Concepción Fernández de Córdova y Campos
 634. Emilia Páez-Jaramillo y Vicente
 635. María Elvira Fernández de Córdova y Álvarez de Bohorques
 636. María de la Concepción Aguado y Flores
 637. Ana de Francisco-Martín y Orrantia
 638. María Cristina Osorio de Moscoso y Borbón
 639. María de la Asunción Sanchiz y Castillo
 640. Sara Castilla y Gómez de Cádiz
 641. María Luisa de Salamanca y Negrete
 642. Queen Maria Pia of Portugal (Luís I's wife), née Maria Pia of Savoy, princess of Italy
 643. Ana, princesa Murat
 644. María Leonor Crescencia Catalina de Salm-Salm, princess of Salm-Salm
 645. María del Carmen de Aguirre-Solarte y Alcíbar
 646. Joaquina Fidalgo y Aguirre
 647. María de los Dolores de Bustos y Riquelme
 648. María de los Dolores Pizarro y Ramírez
 649. Joaquina de Samaniego y Lassús
 650. Ana María Pérez de Vargas y Castrillo
 651. Princess Florestine of Monaco, duchess Wilhelm of Urach
 652. Ramona García y Carrera
 653. Juana de Zavala y Guzmán
 654. Genoveva Samaniego y Pando
 655. Elisa Bayne 
 656. María Josefa Marín y San Martín
 657. Enriqueta María Roca de Togores y Corradini
 658. Mariana Fernández de Córdova y Vera de Aragón
 659. María de los Dolores de Múxica y Uribe
 660. Filomena Fernández de Henestrosa y Santisteban
 661. María de la Encarnación Pacheco y García
 662. Emilia Moldenhaver Brandes 
 663. Charlotte Elisabeth Mary Smith-Athelston 
 664. María Grimanesa de Zavala y Guzmán
 665. María de los Remedios Chacón y Romero de Cisneros
 666. María Isabel Sofía Valera y Alcalá-Galiano
 667. Maria da Conceição de Castro Quintela Emauz 
 668. countess of Sousa
 669. Teresa Francisca de Melo Breyner Sousa Tavares e Moura, 2nd countess of Melo, 20th lady de Melo 
 670. Gabriela Isabel de Sousa Coutinho, 2nd marchioness of Funchal 
 671. Isabel Cristina María de la Paz Mesía y de Queralt
 672. María de Gracia Lasso de la Vega y Quintanilla
 673. María del Pilar Álvarez de Toledo y Álvarez de Toledo
 674. Frances Erskine Inglis, 1st marchioness of Calderón de la Barca 
 675. Pascuala Mayáns y Enríquez de Navarra
 676. Maria de Almeida Portugal 
 677. Maria de Lima 
 678. Luisa de Lilien
 679. Ana de Gregorioy Márquez
 680. María de los Dolores Alberni y Carro
 681. María Josefa Medrano y Maldonado
 682. María de la Purificación de Pineda y Apéstegui
 683. Josefa Jaspe y Macías
 684. Josefa Gaviria y Alcova
 685. Carlota de Pando y Mofino
 686. Inés Sanz de Vallés y Montserrat
 687. Águeda Bernaldo de Quirós y Colón de Larreátegui
 688. María Francisca Escrivá de Romaní y Dusay
 689. María de las Mercedes de Heredia y Zafra-Vázquez
 690. María de la Merced de Ferrer y de Manresa
 691. Josefa Sangro
 692. Jacinta Gutiérrez de la Concha y Fernández de Luco
 693. Isabel Álvarez y Montes
 694. María de la Soledad Fernández de Córdova y Aguilar
 695. Ramona Valledor y Ciño
 696. María de las Mercedes de Fivaller y Centurión
 697. Princess Maria Antonietta of Bourbon-Two Sicilies, Princess Alfonso of Two Sicilies, countess consort of Caserta
 698. Archduchess Maria Isabella of Austria-Tuscany, Princess Francis of the Two Sicilies, countess consort of Trápani (mother of the former)
 699. Victoria Colonna y Álvarez de Toledo
 700. Princess María Inmacutada Luisa of Bourbon-Two Sicilies, Princess Henry of Parma, countess consort of Bardi
 701. Princess Maria Pia of Bourbon-Two Sicilies, 1st wife of Robert I, Duke of Parma
 702. María Ana de Sarria y Albis, viscountess consort de Ayala
 703. Hoshiar Walda Pasha, wife of Ibrahim Pasha of Egypt
 704. Antonia González Echevarría, 1st countess of Agüero
 705. Maria Teresa de Assis Mascarenhas 
 706. Maria Francisca de Paula Orta 
 707. Thérèse Gravier 
 708. Rosa Mariana Biester
 709.  Louise Marie Rogier
 710. Virginia Oldoini, countess of Castiglione and of Costigliole
 711. Agnes Millet d'Arvillars
 712. Natalia Obrescoff, princess consort di Striano
 713. Ana Negrotto-Cambiaso
 714. Maria Luísa de Sousa Holstein, 3rd Duchess of Palmela
 715. Laura Acton
 716. María Leticia Bonaparte-Wyse, princess consort of Solms
 717. Carlota, nobile Richetta de Valgorja
 718. Cecilia Benoist 
 719. Maria Maffei di Boglio
 720. Paola Luisa Enrichetta Rignon, countess Rignon
 721. Princess Elisabeth of Saxony, Princess Ferdinand of Savoy, Duchess consort of Genoa (Queen Margherita of Italy's mother)
 722. Queen Margherita of Italy (Umberto I's wife), née princess Margherita of Savoy-Genoa (inspiring the pizza Margherita)
 723. Princess Marie of Belgium, Countess of Flanders, née Princess Marie of Hohenzollern-Sigmaringen (mother of King Albert I of Belgium)
 724. Queen Alexandra of the United Kingdom (Edward VII's wife), née Princess Alexandra of Denmark  (daughter of Queen Louise of Denmark, 773rd Dame and sister of Princess Thyra of Denmark, 814th Dame and Princess Dagmar of Denmark, 871st Dame)
 725. Elen Wededing
 726. María Josefa Mariátegui y Compton
 727. María de la Paz Barbadillo
 728. María Antonia Ros de Olano y Quintana, 2nd marchioness of Guad-el-Jelú, Dama de la Reina María Victoria 
 729. Nicolasa Gallo de Alcántara y Sives
 730. Gabriela de Anduaga y Mejía
 731. Elisabeth de La Croix de Castries
 732. Luisa de Koudriafsky
 733. Séverine Rosalie von Löwenthal 
 734. Francisca Ramírez y Maroto
 735. Edesia Aquavera y Arahuete
 736. María Isabel Manuel de Villena y Álvarez de las Asturias, 13th Marchioness of Rafal
 737. Friederike Luise von Riegels
 738. María del Carmen Hernández Espinosa de los Monteros
 739. María de los Dolores de Balanzat y Bretagne de Carrión, marchioness consort de Nájera
 740. María del Amparo Sorróndegui y Martínez-Alcaide
 741. Matilde de Altuna y López
 742. María del Rosario de Giles y Rivero
 743. María de las Nieves Rodríguez de Arellano y Armendáriz
 744. María Isabel Nieulant y Villanueva
 745. María del Pilar Arias-Quiroga y Escalera
 746. María Ana Catalina Richards
 747. María Jacinta Orlando e Ibarrola
 748. Elvira Bález y de la Quadra
 749. Archduchess María Carolina of Austria-Teschen, archduchess Rainer Ferdinand of Austria (daughter of Archduke Charles, Duke of Teschen)
 750. Adela Mathilda Helbert
 751. Teresa Carralón y La Rúa
 752. María de los Ángeles de Rivera y Olavide
 753. Enriqueta de Cea Bermúdez y Navarro
 754. Margarita Larios y Martínez de Tejada
 755. María Amada Batiz de Uribarren, 1st countess of Uribarren
 756. Katharine, condesa Kenderffy de Malowitz
 757. Isidra de Quesada y Gutiérrez de los Ríos
 758. Louise-Marguerite de Ward
 759. Mélanie Louise de Champs de Saint-Léger
 760. Balbina Monserrat y Marcos
 761. Princess Sofia Sergeievna Troubetzkoy
 762. María Josefa de Arteaga y Silva
 763. Isabel Daguerre y Garreta
 764. María del Pilar de Guzmán y de la Cerda
 765. María de las Angustias de Arizcún y Heredia
 766. María Luisa de Sotto y Campuzano
 767. Leonor Rigalt y Muns
 768. María Josefa Castrillón y Mera (es)
 769. Micaela Arámburu y Silva
 770. María Brignole-Sale, duquesa consorte de Galliera
 771. Clara Emilia MacDonell y Ulbrick, marchioness consort of las Marismas del Guadalquivir
 772. Harriet Alice Day, baronesa consorte Borthwick
 773. Queen Louise of Denmark (Christian IX's wife), née princess and landgravine Louise of Hesse-Kassel  (mother of Alexandra of Denmark, 724th Dame, Princess Thyra of Denmark, 814th Dame and Princess Dagmar of Denmark, 871st Dame)
 774. Josefa del Águila y Ceballos
 775. María Celina Alfonso y Aldama
 776. Justina Maria da Silva 
 777. Honorina Baamonde y Ortega
 778. Laura Brunetti y Gayoso de los Cobos
 779. Enriqueta Cabarrús y Kirkpatrick, countess of Nava de Tajo
 780. Faustina Casado y Posadillo
 781. María Belén de Echagüe y Méndez de Vigo
 782. María del Carmen Gutiérrez de la Concha y Fernández de Luco
 783. Ramona Hurtado de Mendoza y Ruiz de Otazu
 784. Helene Josephine Moulton, countess consort of Hatzfeld-Wildenburg-Weissweiler 
 785. María del Pilar Jordán de Urríes y Ruiz de Arana
 786. Victoria de los Santos Avilés y Dorticós
 787. María Josefa de Vargas y Díez de Bulnes
 788. Empress Victoria of Germany (Frederick III's wife), née Victoria, Princess Royal (daughter of Queen Victoria, 288th Dame)
 789. María Luisa Carlota de Barroeta-Aldamar y González de Echávarri
 790. Josefa de Collado y Ranero, 1ª marchioness of Revilla de la Cañada
 791. María del Rosario Téllez-Girón y Fernández de Velasco
 792. Josefa Caballero y Muguiro
 793. Carolina Lasquetty y Castro
 794. Gabriela Manuela Chapman y Randolph
 795. Princess Anna of Prussia, princess and landgravine Frederick William of Hesse-Kassel
 796. Manuela Castarión Posada
 797. María Josefa Ruiz del Burgo y Basabrú
 798. Rosa de Bustos y Riquelme
 799. Constança Maria de Figueiredo Cabral da Camara
 800. Josefa Pimentel de Menezes Brito do Rio 
 801. Eulalia de Solms
 802. Grand-Duchess Louise of Baden (Frederick I's wife), née Princess Louise of Prussia
 803. María de los Dolores de Abarzuza y Saris
 804. Inés Goiry y Adot, marchioness consort de Balboa
 805. Queen María Cristina of Spain (Alfonso XII's wife), née archduchess Maria Christina of Austria-Teschen 
 806. Archduchess Elisabeth Franziska of Austria, Queen María Cristina's mother and Queen Marie Henriette of the Belgians's sister (607th Dame)
 807. Gabriela Pallavicini
 808. Maria Melania Lucila Jullienne de Jaurés
 809. María Luisa de Carvajal y Dávalos
 810. María del Rosario Falcó y Osorio
 811. Caralampia Méndez de Vigo y Arizcun
 812. Queen Emma of the Netherlands (William III's wife), née Princess Emma of Waldeck and Pyrmont (mother of Queen Wilhelmina, 897th Dame)
 813. Queen Maria Theresa of Bavaria (Ludwig III's wife), née archduchess Maria Theresa of Austria-Este, princess of Modena
 814. Princess Thyra of Denmark, Crown Princess of Hanover   (daughter of Queen Louise of Denmark, 773th Dame and sister of Princess Alexandra, 724th Dame and Princess Dagmar, 871st Dame)
 815. Duchess Helene in Bavaria, Hereditary Princess of Thurn and Taxis   (sister of Empress Sissi, 481st Dame and Maria Sophie, 552nd Dame; daughter of Princess Ludovika, 613th Dame)
 816. Infanta Mercedes of Spain, Princess of Asturias (daughter of Alfonso XII of Spain and Queen Maria Chritina, 805th Dame; sister of Maria Teresa, 845th Dame)
 817. María Eulalia Osorio de Moscoso y Carvajal
 818. Isabel de Vinent y O'Neill, 2nd marchioness of Vinent
 819. Isabel de Orovio y Fernández de Urrutia
 820. Maria da Assunção da Mata de Sousa Coutinho, 1st marchioness of Penafiel 
 821. María de las Mercedes de Ajuria y Munar
 822. María de Heredia y Livermore, countess consort of Aguiar
 823. María de la Concepción O'Farrill y Montalvo
 824. Joaquina Domínguez y Puente
 825. Luisa Helena Autard de Bragard
 826. María Rafaela de Miorio y Urra
 827. Felisa Ozores y Mosquera
 828. Antonia Rodríguez de Valcárcel y Castillo
 829. Princess Stéphanie of Belgium, Crown Princess of Austria, Hungary and Bohemia (Rudolf, Crown Prince of Austria's wife)(daughter of Queen Marie Henriette of the Belgians, 607th Dame and granddaughter of Queen Louise Marie of the Belgians, 298th Dame) 
 830. Empress Augusta of Germany (Emperor Wilhelm II's wife), née princess Augusta Victoria of Schleswig-Holstein-Sonderburg-Augustenburg 
 831. Teresa Matilde Sofía, condesa Eckbrecht von Dürckheim-Montmartin 
 832. Elena Hano y Mac-Mahon
 833. María de los Dolores Madán y O'Sullivan
 834.  Marie Amélie Green de Saint Marsault, countess consort of Sardelys
 835. Queen Elisabeth of Romanía (Carol I of Romania's wife), née Princess Elisabeth of Wied
 836. Anne Zoé Bernex Philipon 
 837. Trinidad de Vargas y Díez de Bulnes
 838. María del Rosario Losada y Fernández de Liencres
 839. María del Rosario Pérez de Barradas y Fernández de Córdoba
 840. Ana de Sousa Coutinho de Mendoça 
 841. Eugénia Xavier Teles da Gama, 2nd marchioness of Unhão 
 842. Leopoldina D'Adda
 843. Aline Correia Henriques 
 844. Teresa Caracciolo
 845. Infanta Maria Teresa of Spain, princess of Bavaria (daughter of Alfonso XII of Spain and Queen Maria Chritina, 805th Dame; sister of Mercedes, 816th Dame)
 846. Livia Carafa della Stadera
 847. Queen Olga of the Hellenes (George I of Greece's wife), née grand-duchess Olga Constantinovna of Russia
 848. Virginia Coronado y Romero de Tejada
 849. María Sánchez de Marcos
 850. Antonia Laura Alberti y Caro
 851. Olga Luisa Margarita de Feltz-Raasfelt
 852. Amalia Isabel Carlota, condesa Piper
 853. Edla Luisa Carolina Augusta, condesa Wirsen
 854. Queen Sophia of Sweden and Norway (Oscar II's wife), née Princess Sophia of Nassau 
 855. Queen Victoria of Sweden (Gustaf V's wife), née Princess Victoria of Baden (and Queen Sophia's daughter-in-law)
 856. Princess Isabella of Croÿ, Archduchess Friedrich of Austria-Teschen (niece-in-law of Queen María Cristina, 805th Dame)(mother of Maria Christina of Austria-Teschen, 1003rd Dame, Isabella of Austria-Teschen, 1031st Dame and María Alice of Austria-Teschen, 1032nd Dame ) 
 857. Sofía Josefa Zulueta y Wilcox
 858. María de la Concepción Castillo y Ramírez de Arellano
 859. Ana María Cristina Chico de Guzmán y Muñoz
 860. Princess Elvira Alexandra of Bavaria
 861. Ofresia Emma Ysaure
 862. Queen Louise of Denmark (Frederick VIII's wife), née Princess Louise of Sweden-Norway
 863. Agata Nazar-Aga
 864. Rosa de Plazaola y Limonta
 865. Bernardina López de la Torre Ayllón y Jaspe
 866. María de las Mercedes de Retortillo y Díez
 867. Queen Amélie of Portugal (Carlos I's wife), née Princess Amélie of Orléans, Princess of France
 868. María Isabel Ruiz de Arana y Osorio de Moscoso
 869. María del Milagro de Lara y Sanjuán
 870. Teresa de Elío y Arteta
 871. Empress Maria Feodorovna of Russia (Alexander III's wife), née Princess Dagmar of Denmark  (daughter of Queen Louise of Denmark, 773th Dame and sister of Princess Alexandra, 724th Dame and Princess Thyra, 814th Dame)
 872. Leonora, baroness Rothschild 
 873. Evelyn Peers Williams
 874. Natalia Terry y Dorticós
 875. Ramona de Anduaga y Mejía
 876. Archduchess Maria Theresa of Austria-Tuscany, Archduchess Charles Stephen of Austria-Teschen (sister-in-law of Queen Maria Christina, 805th Dame)
 877. María Emilia Cancela Seabra 
 878. María de los Dolores Delavat y Areas
 879. Francisca Jacinta Nogueira da Gama 
 880. Grand Duchess Maria Alexandrovna of Russia, Duchess consort of Saxe-Coburg and Gotha (wife of Prince Alfred of UK, Duke of Edinburgh, Duke of Saxe-Coburg and Gotha)  (mother of Queen Marie of Romania, 1007th Dame, Princess Beatrice, 1026th Dame and Princess Victoria Melita, 1042th Dame)
 881. Mariana Margarida de Sequeira Barreto 
 882. Rita Pessoa de Barros e Sá 
 883. María Antonia Fernández de Córdova y Bernaldo de Quirós
 884. Rosalía Caro y Álvarez de Toledo
 885. Casilda de Salabert y Arteaga
 886. Princess Beatrice of the United Kingdom, Princess Henry of Battenberg (daughter of Queen Victoria, 288th Dame and mother of Queen Victoria Eugenie of Spain, 976th Dame)
 887. Dolores María de Agramonte y Zayas-Bazán, princess consort Radziwiłł
 888. Franziska Seraphica, countess of Herberstein 
 889. Elisa Uriburu y Uriburu
 890. Empress Shōken of Japan (Emperor Meiji's wife), née princess Masako Ichijō
 891. María Matilde de Campos y Cervetto
 892. María de la Natividad Quindós y Villarroel
 893. Olga Andreievna Rostoptchin, countess consort Tornielli-Brusati di Vergano 
 894. Duchess Alexandrine of Saxe-Coburg and Gotha (Ernest II's wife), née Princess Alexandrine of Baden
 895. María Flora de Lemery y Ferrer
 896. Rosa de Arístegui y Doz
 897. Queen Wilhelmina of the Netherlands (daughter of Queen Emma, 812th Dame)
 898. Amalia de Rábago y Hornedo
 899. María de la Paz Daguerre y Garreta
 900. María Manuela del Arroyo y Moret
 901. Princess Pilar of Bavaria (granddaughter of Queen Isabella II of Spain, daughter of Infanta María de la Paz of Spain, 593rd Dame)
 902. Grand Duchess Consort Maria Pavlovna of Russia, née Duchess Marie of Mecklenburg-Schwerin
 903. Archduchess Louise of Austria-Tuscany, Crown Princess of Saxony
 904. Pauline, baronesa de Hoffmann 
 905. María del Carmen Romero Castelló
 906. Elizabeth Wadsworth Van Rensselaer 
 907. Isabel Francia y Carrió
 908. Elena Sarasin y Thomas
 909. Josefa Sandoval de Vasconcellos
 910. Juana de la Puente y Risco, 7th marchioness of Villafuerte, 2nd countess of Casa Saavedra, countess of Guaqui
 911. María del Socorro García de Paredes y Argüelles
 912. María del Pilar de León y de Gregorio
 913. María del Carmen Rodríguez-Avial y Lloréns
 914. Joana Rebelo de Chaves 
 915. María Lívia Ferrari Schindler, wife of João Franco, Prime Minister of Portugal
 916. Alicia Tecla Luisa von Wagner
 917. SE Princess Pauline of Metternich-Winnenburg (née countess Sándor de Szlavnicza)
 918. Felicia Radziwiłł, princess consort de Clary-Aldringen
 919. Princess Hélène of Orléans, duchess Emanuele Filiberto of Aosta
 920. María del Carmen Martel y Arteaga
 921. María de la Encarnación Fernández de Córdoba y Carondelet
 922. María Antonia-Consuelo Manuel de Acuña
 923. Matilde de León y de Gregorio
 924. Adelina Douglas de Drummond Wolff
 925.  Empress Alexandra of Russia (Nicholas II's wife), née Alix of Hesse
 926. Silvia Álvarez de Toledo y Gutiérrez de la Concha
 927. Helen Vincent Seagrave, wife of Julio de Apezteguía y Tarafa, marquess of Apezteguía
 928. Ana Germana Bernaldo de Quirós y Muñoz
 929. Isabel de la Pezuela y Ceballos
 930. Joaquina Angela Rebolledo de Palafox y Guzmán
 931. María de los Dolores Salabert y Arteaga
 932. Princess María Luisa Theresa of Bavaria
 933. Queen Saovabha Phongsri, Queen Consort and Regent of Siam (Thailand)
 934. Umeko Itō, esposa del Primer Ministro de Japón, Itō Hirobumi
 935. Léonie Beeckman de Crayloo 
 936. María del Pilar Loreto Osorio y Gutiérrez de los Ríos
 937. Juana Piñeyro y Echeverri, 7ª countess of Mollina
 938. María de los Dolores Desmaissiéres y Fernández de Santillán
 939. Luisa Pérez de Guzmán el Bueno y Gordón
 940. Josefa Fernández-Durán y Caballero
 941. María de la Concepción de Arteaga y Gutiérrez de la Concha
 942. Carlota Espinosa de los Monteros y Guisasola
 943. Princess Isabelle of Orléans, Duchess of Guise (October 24th, 1899)
 944. Ángela Roca de Togores
 945. Queen Elena of Italy, née princess Elena of Montenegro
 946. Emma von und zu Daun
 947. Henriette Adolphine Humbertine de Mailly-Nesle
 948. Geneviève de Liedekerke
 949. María del Patrocinio Patiño y Mesa
 950. Juana Ruiz de Arana y Saavedra
 951. Amalia Loring y Heredia, 1st Marchioness of Silvela (Prime Minister Francisco Silvela's widow)
 952. María Manuela de Urbina y Ceballos-Escalera
 953. Magdalena Brackembury y Mac Guilloway
 954. Marie Thérèse Durvis
 955. María de la Fuencisla Bernaldo de Quirós y Muñoz
 956. Helena Maria Domingas de Sousa Holstein, 4th duchess of Palmela 
 957. Mariana das Dores de Melo e Abreu Soares de Brito Barbosa Palha de Vasconcelos Guedes, 4th countess of Murça 
 958. Princess Isabel Alfonsa of Bourbon-Two Sicilies, infanta of Spain and countess Zamoyska (Alfonso XII of Spain's granddaughter)
 959. María de la Concepción Girón y Aragón
 960. Tomasa Pignatelli de Aragón Cortés
 961. Duchess Cecilie of Mecklenburg-Schwerin, Crown Princess of Germany and Prussia (Emperor Wilhelm II's daughter-in-law)
 962. Maria Josepha of Saxony, archduchess of Austria 
 963. María del Rosario González de la Riva y Trespalacios
 964. María Gayón y Barrié
 965. Antonia Franco e Iglesias
 966. Isabel Armada y Fernández de Córdoba
 967. María Teresa de Muguiro y Cerragería
 968. María de los Desamparados Bernaldo de Quirós y Muñoz
 969. María de las Angustias Martos y Arizcun
 970. Narcisa de Martos y Arizcún
 971. María de la Encarnación de Silva y Carvajal, countess del Puerto 
 972. María del Pilar de Sentmenat y Patiño
 973. María del Milagro de León y Liñán
 974. María del Rosario Rodríguez de Rivas y de la Gándara
 975. María de la Encarnación de Pablo y Llorente
 976. Queen Victoria Eugenie of Spain (Alfonso XIII's wife), née princess Victoria Eugenie of Battenberg, daughter of Princess Beatrice of the United Kingdom, 886th Dame)
 977. Nadine d'Ozerow
 978. Eugénie Marie Thérèse Cambon, esposa del embajador de Francia Jules Martin Cambon (July 20th, 1906)
Marie-Thérese-Charlotte Waldeck-Rousseau (May 16th, 1902)
 979. Eugénia Teles da Silva, 12th Countess of Tarouca 
 980. Isabel Juliana de Saldanha da Gama 
 981. María del Carmen Díaz de Mendoza y Aguado
 982. Isabel de Silva y Carvajal
 983. Virginia López de Chicheri y García-Caro, marchioness consort de Sotelo
 984. María Calderón y Ozores
 985. Princess Louise of Orléans, princess of France (daughter of Prince Philippe, Count of Paris and Countess of Barcelona's mother)
 986. Archduchess Maria Dorothea of Austria, Duchess Philippe of Orléans, sister-in-law of the former
 987. Winifred Cavendish-Bentinck, Duchess of Portland
 988. María de la Concepción Roca-Tallada y Castellano
 989. Julia Herrera y Herrera
 990. Ana Enriqueta de Olano y Loyzaga
 991. María de la Ascensión González-Neira y Somoza
 992. Princess Louise Margaret of Prussia, duchess of Connaught and Strathearn
 993. María de la Trinidad de Scholtz-Hermensdorff, duchess of Parcent
 994. Fernanda de Salabert y Arteaga
 995. María del Carmen Hurtado de Zaldívar y Heredia
 996. Berenguela Collado y del Alcázar
 997. María del Pilar Caro y Széchényi
 998. Felicia Bolivia de Francisco-Martín y Orrantia
 999. María de Belén Rojas y Darnell
 1000. Ana Girona y Vidal
 1001. María-Teresa Olivia Cornwallis-West, princess consort of Pless
 1002. Archduchess Maria Annunciata of Austria, daughter of Archduke Karl Ludwig of Austria
 1003. Archduchess Maria Christina of Austria-Teschen, Hereditary Princess Emanuel Alfred of Salm-Salm (sister of Isabella, 1031st Dame and María Alice, 1032nd Dame; daughter of Archduchess Isabella of Austria-Teschen, 856th Dame, grandniece of Queen María Cristina, 805th Dame)
 1004. María Josefa Brusi y García
 1005. Rosa Reig y Martí
 1006. Victoria Esperanza Mateo-Sagasta y Vidal, 1st countess of Sagasta 
 1007. Queen Marie of Romania, née princess of Saxe-Coburg and Gotha (granddaughter of Queen Victoria, 288th Dame and daughter of Duchess Maria Alexandrovna of Saxe-Coburg-Gotha, 880th Dame)
 1008. Esperanza de Saráchaga y Lobanov de Rostov, baroness consort Truchsess von Weltzhausen
 1009. Princess Helena Victoria of Schleswig-Holstein-Sonderburg-Augustenburg (granddaughter of Queen Victoria, 288th Dame)
 1010. Itsuko Nashimoto no-miya-hi, marchioness Nabeshima
 1011. María de la Visitación-Mencía de Collado y del Alcázar
 1012. María Emilia Torres de Itambi
 1013. María de los Ángeles Bernar y Llácer
 1014. María Victoria Montero-Ríos y Villegas
 1015. Tsuneko no-miya-hi, princesa Fushimi
 1016. Queen Consort Elisabeth of the Belgians (née Duchess in Bavaria)
 1017. Emilia Carreras e Iragorry
 1018. Constance Edwina Cornwallis-West, duchess consort de Westminster
 1019. Josefa Bouquet Roldán
 1020. María del Carmen López Andrés
 1021. María de la Concepción de Azlor de Aragón y Hurtado de Zaldívar
 1022. María África de Carvajal y Quesada 
 1023. Isabel de Iranzo y Daguerre
 1024. María de la Trinidad García-Sancho y Zavala
 1025. María de la Concepción Brunet y Echagüe
 1026. Princess Beatrice of Saxe-Coburg and Gotha, duchess of Galliera (granddaughter of Queen Victoria, 288th Dame and daughter of Duchess Maria Alexandrovna of Saxe-Coburg-Gotha, 880th Dame)
 1027. Lucía Ozores y Saavedra
 1028. Helen Manchester Gates
 1029. María Josefa Argüelles y Díaz
 1030. María de la Concepción Benítez Ruiz
 1031. Archduchess Isabella of Austria, princess Georg of Bavaria (sister of Maria Christina, 1003rd Dame and María Alice, 1032nd Dame; daughter of Archduchess Isabella of Austria-Teschen, 856th Dame, grandniece of Queen María Cristina, 805th Dame)
 1032. Archduchess María Alice of Austria-Teschen, baroness consort Waldbott von Bassenheim (daughter of Archduke Friedrich of Austria, Duke of Teschen) 
 1033. Archduchess Gabriele of Austria-Teschen (daughter of Archduke Friedrich of Austria, Duke of Teschen)
 1034. María del Carmen Fernández de Córdoba y Pérez de Barradas
 1035. Josefa Manzanedo e Intentas
 1036. Princess Victoria Louise of Prussia, Duchess of Brunswick
 1037. Angélica Siciliano
 1038. Carlota Maximiliana Escandón y Barrón
 1039. Petronila Salamanca y Hurtado de Zaldívar
 1040. Mary-Anne-Kathleen-Emily Bulkeley-Williams
 1041. María del Pilar Gayoso de los Cobos y Sevilla
 1042. Princess Victoria Melita of Saxe-Coburg and Gotha (granddaughter of Queen Victoria, 288th Dame and daughter of Duchess Maria Alexandrovna of Saxe-Coburg-Gotha, 880th Dame)
 1043. María Salvadora Bermúdez de Castro y Díez
 1044. Isabel de Guillamas y Caro
 1045. Casilda Fernández de Henestrosa y Salabert
 1046. María de la Concepción de Allendesalazar y Bernar
 1047. Paulina María de la Concepción Bauer y Morpurgo
 1048. María del Carmen García-Loygorri y Murrieta
 1049. Teresa Fernández de Villalta y Coca
 1050. María Luisa de Silva y Fernández de Henestrosa
 1051. María de la Concepción de Heredia y Grund
 1052. María Inés de la Gándara y Plazaola
 1053. Emilia Pardo-Bazán y de la Rúa-Figueroa, 1st Countess of Pardo Bazán (September 
 1054. María Codorníu y Bosch de la Cierva (October 12th, 1915)
 1055. María de los Dolores Armero y Peñalver, Dowager Duchess of Ahumada (July 5th, 1915)
 1056. Juana Bertrán de Lis y Gurowsky (May 10th, 1916)
 1057. Margarita Bertrán de Lis y Gurowsky (May 10th, 1916)
 1058. María del Carmen Barrenechea y Montegui
 1059. María de la Concepción Camacho y Díaz-Durán
 1060. Empress Teimei, empress consort of Japan (née princess Sadako Kujō, mother of Emperor Hirohito)
 1061. Matilde de Ulloa y Calderón
 1062. María de los Dolores Vallier y García-Alessón
 1063. Ana de Osma y Zavala, Dowager Countess of Casa Valencia (February 26th, 1917)
 1064. María Luisa López y Nieulant, Dowager Marquise of Albaserrada (February 26th, 1917)
 1065. Ramona López de Ayala y del Hierro
 1066. María de los Dolores Chávarri y Salazar
 1067. María del Carmen de Amar de la Torre y Bauzá
 1068. María de las Mercedes Bosch y Bienert (February 26th, 1917)
 1069. María de la Concepción Fernández-Durán y Caballero
 1070. Matilde Álvarez Moya
 1071. Petronila Pombo y Escalante
 1072. Luisa Marcotte de Quisiéres
 1073. María Josefa Abella y Fuertes
 1074. Julieta Verhaegen
 1075. Princess Marie Louise of Orléans, princess Philip of the Two-Sicilies
 1076. Ana María Méndez de Vigo y Méndez de Vigo
 1077. María de Alzola y González de Castejón
 1078. María del Carmen Rafaela de los Ríos y Enríquez
 1079. María del Pilar de Carvajal y Hurtado de Mendoza
 1080. Lady Irene Frances Adza Denison, Marchioness (consort) of Carisbrooke (Queen Victoria Eugenie's sister-in-law)
 1081. Carolina de Carvajal y Quesada (February 4th, 1919)
 1082. María del Rosario de Vereterra y de Armada, 7th Marquise of Canillejas (February 24th, 1919)
 1083. María Teresa Parladé y Heredia, Dowager Marquise of Yanduri (February 24th, 1919)
 1084. María Josefa de Goyeneche y Gamio, 1st Duchess of Goyeneche, Countess of Gamio
 1085. María de las Virtudes Martínez de Irujo y del Alcázar, Dowager Marquise de Lambertye-Gerbéviller (March 8th, 1919)
 1086. Leticia Bueno y Garzón, Countess of Agrela (March 29th, 1919)
 1087. Isidra Pons y Serra (March 29th, 1919)
 1088. María de las Mercedes de Sentmenat y Patiño, 1st Marquise of Santa Mori (March 29th, 1919)
 1089. María de Casanova y de Vallés, Marquise of Camps (March 29th, 1919)
 1090. Montserrat Desvalls y Amat (March 29th, 1919)
 1091. Natalia de Barandiarán y de las Bárcenas
 1092. María de la Concepción de Santa Cruz y Navia-Osorio, 13th Marquise of Santa Cruz de Marcenado (June 2nd, 1919)
 1093. María de las Mercedes Moltó y Rodríguez de Pérez Caballero (June 2nd, 1919)
 1094. Infanta Beatriz of Spain, Princess of Citivella-Cesi (daughter of Alfonso XIII of Spain) (June 22nd, 1919)
 1095. María de la Paz Olalla y Casasola, Dowager Countess of Hornachuelos (June 23rd, 1919)
 1096. Hilaria Suari y Folch
 1097. María de los Dolores Catarinéu y Ferrán
 1098. SAS Princess Charlotte of Monaco, Duchess of Valentinois
 1099. Carolina Bourgeois
 1100. María Julia Elena Martínez de Hoz y Acevedo, Countess de los Llanos (March 8th, 1920)
 1101. María de los Dolores de Caries y de Ferrer
 1102. Francisca Cornet y Enrich (August 3rd, 1920)
 1103. Henriette Penon
 1104. Ana Fernández de Henestrosa y Gayoso de los Cobos, Duchess of Medinaceli (April 18th, 1921)
 1105. Isabelle d'Oultremont
 1106. Belle Layton Wyatt (July 11th, 1912)
 1107. María Cristina de Borbón y Madán
 1108. María de los Dolores de Cárcer y de Ros, 6th Baroness of Maldá y Maldanell (April 20th, 2021)
 1109. Princess Clara Eugenie of Bavaria (daughter of Infanta Amelia Philippina, 296th Dame and sister of Isabella of Bavaria, 612th Dame; niece of King-Consort Francis, Duke of Cádiz)
 1110. Isabel de Lersundi y Blanco, 2nd Countess of Lersundi (1921)
 1111. María de la Asunción de Vinuesa y Bessón, Countess of Castilfalé (December 26th, 1921)
 1112. Infanta Maria Cristina of Spain, countess of Marone (daughter of Alfonso XIII of Spain) (December 26th, 1921)
 1113. Augusta von Seefried auf Buttenheim, princess consorts of Bavaria (countess von Seefried auf Buttenheim)
 1114. María de la Piedad Martínez de Irujo y Caro (February 13th, 1922)
 1115. Julia de Montaner y Malattó (February 13th, 1922)
 1116. María del Dulce Xifré y Chacón, 3rd Marquise of Isasi (March 27th, 1922)
 1117. María del Carmen Somonte y Basabe, Countess of Zubiría (March 27th, 1922)
 1118. María del Carmen de Zabálburu y Mazarredo, Countess of Heredia Spínola (March 27th, 1922)
 1119. María del Milagro Girona y Canaleta
 1120. María de la Piedad de Iturbe y von Scholtz-Hermensdorff, princesa consorte de Hohenlohe-Langenburg
 1121. María de la Concepción Kirkpatrick y O'Farrill, 5th Marquise de las Marismas del Guadalquivir (November 6th, 1922)
 1122. María del Carmen Angoloti y Mesa, Duchess de la Victoria (January, 1923)
 1123. Princess María de las Mercedes of Bavaria, infanta of Spain, Princess Irakli Bagration of Mukhrani (daughter of Infanta Maria Teresa, princess of Bavaria, 845th Dame; granddaughter of Queen Maria Chritina, 805th Dame; niece of Princess Mercedes of Asturias, 816th Dame) (July 9th, 1923)
 1124. Francisca Ajuria y Temple
 1125. Francisca O'Reilly y Pedroso, 5th Countess of Buenavista (10, 1923)
 1126. Beatriz de León y de Loynaz
 1127. María de la Aurora Ozores y Saavedra
 1128. Isabel Balbo-Bertone di Sambuy
 1129. Francesca Corsi Salviati 
 1130. María Dominga de Queralt y Fernández-Maquieira
 1131. Joaquina Chacón y Silva
 1132. Aldegonde Obert de Thieusies
 1133. Marie de Hemricourt de Grünne
 1134. María Blanca de Solís y Desmaissiéres
 1135. María del Carmen Ferrer-Vidal y Soler, Dowager Marquise of Montsolís (July 10th, 1923)
 1136. María de las Mercedes Amat y Brugada
 1137. María de las Mercedes Gómez de Uribarri, Dowager Marquise of Foronda (July 10th, 1923)
 1138. Josefina Fernández-Gayón y Barrie (July 10th, 1923)
 1139. Ana María de Urquiza y Catalá, Dowager Marquise of Valmediana (August 5th, 1924)
 1140. Virginia Lazzari di Gifflenga
 1141. Isabel de Silva y Borchgrave
 1142. María Clemencia Ramírez de Saavedra y Alfonso, 9th Marquise of Villasinda (December 10th, 1924)
 1143. María Teresa Núñez del Pino y Quiñones de León (December 10th, 1924)
 1144. Maria Maffei di Boglio, countess consort Bruschi-Falgari 
 1145. María de la Concepción Rodríguez García-Tagle (Concha Espina). (December 10th, 1924)
 1146. Isabel Nieulant y Altuna, 15th Marquise of Villamagna (January 25th, 1925)
 1147. María del Carmen San Gil y Ollo, Countess of Sobradiel (1925)
 1148. María de la Ascensión Reynoso y Mateo (May 25th, 1925)
 1149. Virginia Woodbury y Lowery, Dowager Duchess of Arcos (August 26th, 1925)
 1150. Isabel Eugenia Ibarreta y Uhagón Vedia, Dowager Marquise of Valdeterrazo (August 26th, 1925)
 1151. María Luisa Gómez y Pelayo, 1st Marquise of Pelayo (December 14th, 1925)
 1152. Enriqueta de Borbón y Parade, 4th Duchess of Sevilla (February 20th, 1926)
 1153. María de la Asunción Isabel Martínez de Irujo y Caro, Duchess of Vistahermosa (May 3rd, 1926)
 1154. Mary, Princess Royal and Countess of Harewood
 1155. María Rivero y González, Dowager Marquise of Casa Domecq (August 9th, 1926)
 1156. Josefa Diosdado y Armero, 13th Marquise of Ángulo (April 13th, 1927)
 1157. Isabel de Heredia y Loring, Countess of Guadalhorce (April 13th, 1927)
 1158. María Antonia Atienza y Benjumea, Dowager Marquise of Valencia (April 13th, 1927)
 1159. María de la Concepción Loring y Heredia, Dowager Marquise de la Rambla (April 13th, 1927)
 1160. María Cristina Falcó y Álvarez de Toledo, 7th Countess of Frigiliana (May 23rd, 1927)
 1161. María Isabel González de Olañeta e Ibarreta, Duchess of Montpensier 
 1162. Sofía Zamoyska, condesa Zamoyska
 1163. Brígida Montis y Allendesalazar, Marquise of Linares (October 3rd, 1927)
 1164. Princess Anne of Orléans, princess of France, Duchess Consort of Aosta
 1165. María del Carmen de la Gándara y Lemery, Marquise de la Gándara (March 6, 1928)
 1166. Princess Alice of Greece & Denmark (née Princess Alice of Battenberg, the Duke of Edinburgh's mother, 1st cousin of Queen Victoria Eugenie, 976th Dame)
 1167. María del Carmen Pérez de Valdivielso y Torruella (July 17, 1928)
 1168. Julia Schmidtlein y García-Teruel, Marquise of Bermejillo del Rey (July 17, 1928)
 1169. María Felisa Esteban de León y Navarro de Balboa (1928)
 1170. Queen Alexandrine of Denmark (née Duchess Alexandrine of Mecklenburg-Schwerin) (1929)
 1171. Infanta María de las Mercedes, countess of Barcelona (Count of Barcelona's wife and Juan Carlos I of Spain's mother), née princess María de las Mercedes of Bourbon-Two Sicilies
 1172. Infanta María de los Dolores of Bourbon-Two-Sicilies, princess Czartoryska (Countess of Barcelona's sister)
 1173. Infanta María de la Esperanza of Two-Sicilies, princess of Orléans-Braganza (Countess of Barcelona's sister)
 1174. Infanta Maria Carolina of Bourbon-Two-Sicilies, Countess Zamoyska
 1175. María del Carmen Xifré y Chacón, 6th Countess of Campo Alegre
 1176. María de las Mercedes Miralles de Villegas (1929)
 1177. Manuela Ternero y Vázquez
 1178. María Prieto de Odiaga
 1179. Consuelo de Cubas y Erice, Countess of Santa María de la Sisla
 1180. María de la Concepción Guzmán y O'Farrill, 4th countess of Vallellano
 1181. María Inmaculada de Carvajal y Hurtado de Mendoza, Countess of Asalto
 1182. María del Pilar Losada y Rosés, Marquise of Santa María de Barbará
 1183. María de los Ángeles de Muguiro y Beruete, marchioness of Torrehermosa
 1184. HIH Kikuko, Princess Takamatsu, née Kikuko, Princess Tokugawa 
 1185. María del Carmen Satrústegui y Barrie
 1186. María Manuela Armada y de los Ríos-Enríquez, Marquise of Casa Valdés
 1187. María Isabel Rodríguez-Valdés y Ferrán
 1188. María de la Concepción Dahlander y Francés
 1189. Camila Fabra y Puig
 1190. María Buenaventura Bransí y Terrades
 1191. Infanta Alicia of Spain, Duchess Dowager of Calabria, née princess Alicia of Parma (daughter-in-law of Princess Mercedes of Asturias, 816th Dame; mother of Carlos of Bourbon-Two-Sicilies, Infante of Spain, Duke of Calabria)
 1192. Infanta Pilar, Duchess of Badajoz, Juan Carlos I of Spain's sister
 1193. Infanta Margarita, Duchess of Soria y Hernani, Juan Carlos I of Spain's sister
 1194. Queen Sofía of Spain (Juan Carlos I of Spain's wife), née Princess of Greece and Denmark. Last dame inducted.

References

Bibliography 
 Las Primeras Damas de la Orden de María Luisa.  About the women admitted into the order in its first year.

External links 
 Damas de la Real Orden de la Reina María Luisa

Maria Luisa

it:Categoria:Dame dell'Ordine della regina Maria Luisa
pl:Kategoria:Damy Orderu Królowej Marii Luizy